The Monastery of the Most Holy Mother of God (Macedonian: Жеглиговски манастир), commonly known as Matejče (Матејче) or Matejić (Матејић), is a 14th-century Orthodox monastery located in the village of Matejče on the slopes of Skopska Crna Gora, near Skopje and Kumanovo. The village is inhabited by 89% Muslim Albanians and 10% Orthodox Serbs (2002 census).

The monastery was built in the 14th century on the ruins of an older, Byzantine Greek church built in 1057–59, as evidenced by preserved Greek inscriptions. It was mentioned for the first time in 1300 in a chrysobull of the Serbian king Stefan Milutin (r. 1282–1321). In the mid-14th century, the Serbian emperor Stefan Dušan (r. 1331–55) started reconstructing the monastery, finished by his son Stefan Uroš V in 1357 (thus becoming his endowment). Coins of Uros V has been found at the site. Isaiah the Serb and Vladislav Gramatik lived in the monastery. In the 18th century the roof was removed by the Ottomans and put on the Eski Mosque in Kumanovo, after which it deteriorated. In 1926–34 the monastery was renovated.

It is designed in the cross-in-square plan (as is also Marko's Monastery and the Banja Monastery). The dome bears the same exonarthex technique as Hilandar. It was painted in 1356–57.

The monastery was occupied and desecrated by Albanian insurgents and used as a base and munition storage during the Insurgency in the Republic of Macedonia (2001). Serbian Patriarch Pavle issued a statement to the UN regarding the destruction of Serbian monasteries in Kosovo, and the threat of destruction of monasteries in Macedonia. The church exterior was not damaged, however, the interior and inventory were stolen or burnt. 

During the conflict, the surrounding area saw the forced expulsion of ethnic Serbian and Macedonian inhabitants, whose houses were set to fire, and who never managed to return to their homes.

Gallery

References

Further reading

Lipkovo Municipality
Fresco paintings in North Macedonia
2001 insurgency in Macedonia
Medieval Serbian Orthodox monasteries
Eastern Orthodox monasteries in North Macedonia
Nemanjić dynasty endowments
Serbs of North Macedonia
14th-century Serbian Orthodox church buildings